Fred Krone (June 19, 1930 – January 12, 2010), also known as Krunch, was an American actor and stuntman who worked predominantly in movie Westerns.

Career
Krone was born in Kentucky. He began working in the 1950s performing stunts and as an actor. He worked in the early days of Steve McQueen’s career and doubled for McQueen in 1960/61 on the TV series Wanted: Dead or Alive, among others.

Krone had appearances on The Range Rider, Yancy Derringer (S1E02 "Gallatin Street"), The Rifleman, The Texan, The Life and Legend of Wyatt Earp, and many more. He made a brief appearance on Perry Mason in 1966 as jewel thief and murder victim Nils Dorow in "The Case of the Tsarina's Tiara." He worked well into the 1970s and appeared on several episodes of Mannix.

Death
Krone died on January 12, 2010, in Santa Paula, California after a long battle with cancer.

Filmography

References

External links
 

1930 births
2010 deaths
People from Kentucky
Male actors from Kentucky
American male film actors
American male television actors
American stunt performers
Deaths from cancer in California
20th-century American male actors
Male Western (genre) film actors
Western (genre) television actors